The Valley Division of the Atchison, Topeka and Santa Fe Railway ran from San Francisco to Barstow in California.  It is now part of the BNSF Railway's Stockton Subdivision and Bakersfield Subdivision.

Much of the line, south to Bakersfield, was constructed in the 1890s as part of the San Francisco and San Joaquin Valley Railroad.  

The Valley Division and Los Angeles Division were merged into the "California Division" in 1988.

However, by 1995 it had been recreated an contained four subdivisions:
 Bakersfield (Bakersfield to Calwa);
 Stockton (Calwa to Richmond);
 Riverbank (Riverbank to Oakdale);
 Sunset Railway (Gosford to Taft); and most of a fifth,
 Mojave (Hutt to Bakersfield, with trackage rights on Southern Pacific's Tahachapi line).

Spurs
Fresno Interurban District: In the Fresno area, a spur known as the Fresno Interurban District ran from Fresno to the east.  The stations on that spur were Hammond, Cincotta, Bartonette, Cameo, Burness, Fairview, Big Bunch, Zediker, Riverbend, Elk, and Belmont Ave.  The Tulare Valley Railroad acquired the tracks from Hammond to Cameo around 1992. 

Laton and Western Railroad:  South of Frenso, a line from Laton west to Lanare was constructed from 1910-12.  An abandonment application for the line, approximately 17.56 miles, was filed in 1980.  Other stations on the spur, running west from Laton, were Shirley, Gepford, and Shilling.

Arvin Subdivision:  A 17-mile spur from Magunden to Arvin, acquired by the Tulare Valley Railroad in 1992, and later the San Joaquin Valley Railroad

References

California railroads